The Wells Fargo Building is a historic office building in downtown Portland, Oregon, United States. The large doorstep at the building's entryway required the largest slab of granite ever shipped to Portland at the time. Completed in 1907, the steel-framed building is considered the city's first true skyscraper. The clock tower of the 1892-completed Oregonian Building, which measured  in height, made that building the tallest in the city overall.

In 1946, the building was purchased by the United States National Bank of Portland, whose headquarters was located in a smaller building located directly adjacent, immediately to the south.  U.S. National Bank used the Wells Fargo Building to expand its downtown Portland headquarters.

In 1986, the building was placed on the National Register of Historic Places.

See also
Architecture of Portland, Oregon
National Register of Historic Places listings in Southwest Portland, Oregon

References

External links
 
 Portland Business Journal: Portland's first skyscraper passes the century mark

Skyscraper office buildings in Portland, Oregon
National Register of Historic Places in Portland, Oregon
Wells Fargo buildings
Bank buildings on the National Register of Historic Places in Oregon
1907 establishments in Oregon
Southwest Portland, Oregon
Portland Historic Landmarks